András Tóth (born 16 December 1973) is a Hungarian football player.

External links
 Vasas SC official website 
 

1973 births
Living people
Hungarian footballers
Hungary international footballers
Vasas SC players
Association football defenders
Vasas SC managers
FC Sopron players
Hungarian football managers